The General Tire 150 is a  annual ARCA Menards Series and ARCA Menards Series West race held at Phoenix Raceway in Avondale, Arizona. The inaugural event was held on March 6, 2020, and was won by Chandler Smith. In 2021, the ARCA Menards Series West joined the ARCA Menards Series in this race, making it a combination race for both series. The race is also currently the West Series season-opener.

History
ARCA's inaugural trip to Phoenix was announced along with the rest of the 2020 series schedule on October 10, 2019. The race is a virtual carryover from the then-NASCAR K&N Pro Series West, which had run at the track at least once annually since 1998. On February 20, 2020, series tire manufacturer General Tire was announced as the race's title sponsor.

Past winners

References

External links
 

2020 establishments in Arizona
ARCA Menards Series races
ARCA Menards Series
ARCA Menards Series West
Recurring sporting events established in 2020
Annual sporting events in the United States
March sporting events
NASCAR races at Phoenix Raceway